Erskine College is a collection of historic buildings and landscapes (including the Chapel of the Sacred Heart and Main Block Convent) in Wellington, New Zealand.

Built in 1905 by the Society of the Sacred Heart (Sacré Coeur), the buildings served as a Catholic girls' boarding school (Convent of the Sacred Heart at Island Bay) until its closure in 1985.

The name was changed to Erskine College in the late 1960s to avoid confusion with Sacred Heart College, Lower Hutt; being named after Mother Janet Erskine Stuart, the fifth Superior General of the Society of the Sacred Heart.

The buildings and grounds are now classified as a "Category I" ("places of special or outstanding historical or cultural heritage significance or value") historic place by Heritage New Zealand.

The college buildings, with the exception of the chapel, were controversially demolished by its owners The Wellington Company in 2018, to make way for 96 townhouses.

References

Old Girls
 Margaret Mary Barry
 Dame Luamanuvao Winifred "Winnie" Alexandra Laban
 Belinda Cordwell

External links
Erskine College chapel will finally be strengthened
Erskine College's Chapel of the Sacred Heart on Wellington City Councils Heritage List
Erskine College Chapel, plan by John Swan 
Erskine College's main block on Wellington City Councils Heritage List
video about Erskine College on YouTube
Erskine College Conservation Plan 2015

Buildings and structures in Wellington City
Heritage New Zealand Category 1 historic places in the Wellington Region
Educational institutions established in 1906
1906 establishments in New Zealand
1900s architecture in New Zealand